2010–11 Nemzeti Bajnokság I (men's handball) season.

Team information

Regular season

Standings

Pld - Played; W - Won; L - Lost; PF - Points for; PA - Points against; Diff - Difference; Pts - Points.

Results
In the table below the home teams are listed on the left and the away teams along the top.

Champion play-off

Semifinals

|}

|}

3rd Place

|}

Finals

|}

Final standings

Pld - Played; W - Won; L - Lost; PF - Points for; PA - Points against; Diff - Difference; Pts - Points.

5 to 8 play-off

Final standings

Pld - Played; W - Won; L - Lost; PF - Points for; PA - Points against; Diff - Difference; Pts - Points.

Relegation Round

Final standings

Pld - Played; W - Won; L - Lost; PF - Points for; PA - Points against; Diff - Difference; Pts - Points.

References 

Nemzeti Bajnokság I (men's handball)
2010–11 domestic handball leagues
Nemzeti Bajnoksag I Men